Juan Núñez de Prado may refer to:
Juan Núñez de Prado (conquistador), 16th-century Spanish conquistador known for his conquest of Tucumán Province
Juan Núñez de Prado (Grand Master of Calatrava) (died 1355), Castilian nobleman who became Master of the Order of Calatrava